Daniel Magda (born 25 November 1997) is a Slovak footballer who plays as defender for Slovak club MFK Zemplín Michalovce, on loan from Železiarne Podbrezová.

Career

Železiarne Podbrezová
Magda made his professional debut for ŽP Šport Podbrezová against Ružomberok on 30 April 2016. Magda was fielded in a stoppage time, replacing Matúš Turňa. Podbrezová won 3-1.

References

External links
 FO ŽP Šport Podbrezová official club profile 
 
 Futbalnet Profile 

1997 births
Living people
Sportspeople from Prešov
Slovak footballers
Association football defenders
FK Železiarne Podbrezová players
FC ŠTK 1914 Šamorín players
FC Nitra players
MFK Zemplín Michalovce players
Slovak Super Liga players
2. Liga (Slovakia) players